Isaac Bacharach (January 5, 1870 – September 5, 1956) was an American Republican Party politician from New Jersey who represented the 2nd congressional district from 1915 to 1937.

Early life and education
Born in Philadelphia, to Betty (Nusbaum) and Jacob Bacharach, Bacharach moved to New Jersey in 1881 with his parents. They settled in Atlantic City, where he attended the public schools. He entered the real-estate business and also became interested in the lumber business and in banking.

Political career
He served as member of the council of Atlantic City from 1905 to 1910, and served as a member of the New Jersey General Assembly in 1911. His brother, Harry Bacharach, was also involved in Atlantic City politics and served several terms as mayor.

Congress
Bacharach was elected as a Republican to the Sixty-fourth and to the ten succeeding Congresses, serving in office from March 4, 1915 to January 3, 1937, but was an unsuccessful candidate for reelection in 1936 to the Seventy-fifth Congress. He was also a delegate to the 1920 Republican National Convention in Chicago.

Betty Bacharach Home
Isaac Bacharach and his brother Harry founded the Betty Bacharach Home for Afflicted Children in honor of their mother, which opened in 1924. The home cared for children afflicted with infantile paralysis. The building at 2305 Atlantic Avenue, Longport, became the borough hall in 1990.

After Congress

After leaving Congress, he engaged in the real-estate and insurance business in Atlantic City until his death there on September 5, 1956. He was interred in Mount Sinai Cemetery in Philadelphia.

See also 
 List of Jewish members of the United States Congress

References

External links

Isaac Bacharach at The Political Graveyard

1870 births
1956 deaths
Politicians from Atlantic City, New Jersey
Politicians from Philadelphia
Jewish members of the United States House of Representatives
Republican Party members of the New Jersey General Assembly
Republican Party members of the United States House of Representatives from New Jersey